Kavilo (Hungarian: Rákóczitelep or Kavilló) is a village in Serbia. It is situated in the Bačka Topola municipality, in the North Bačka District, Vojvodina province. The village has a Hungarian ethnic majority. Its population was 233 in the 2002 census.

See also
List of places in Serbia
List of cities, towns and villages in Vojvodina

Places in Bačka